Acalypta parvula is a species of lace bug in the family Tingidae. It is found in Africa, Europe and Northern Asia (excluding China), and North America.

References

Further reading

 
 
 
 
 
 
 
 
 
 

Tingidae
Insects described in 1807
Taxa named by Carl Fredrik Fallén